The 2000 Speedway Grand Prix Qualification or GP Challenge was a series of motorcycle speedway meetings used to determine the 12 riders that would qualify for the 2000 Speedway Grand Prix to join the other 10 riders that finished in the leading positions from the 1999 Speedway Grand Prix.

The format changed from the previous year, in that only 2 riders would qualify straight from the Intercontinental and Continental finals and 10 riders would qualify through the GP Challenge.

Billy Hamill won the GP Challenge.

Format
 First Round - 6 riders from Sweden, 5 from Denmark, 3 from Finland, 2 from Norway to Scandinavian Final
 First Round - 32 riders from Continental quarter finals to Continental semi-finals
 First Round - 8 riders from British Final to Overseas Final
 First Round - 4 riders from Australian Final to Overseas Final
 First Round - 4 riders from United States Final to Overseas Final
 Second Round - 8 riders from Scandinavian Final to Intercontinental Final
 Second Round - 8 riders from Overseas Final to Intercontinental Final
 Second Round - 16 riders from Continental semi-finals to Continental Final
 Third Round - 11 riders from positions 11-21 from the 1999 Grand Prix & World U21 champion to GP Challenge
 Third Round - 1 rider from the Continental Final to 2000 Grand Prix and 5 to GP Challenge
 Third Round - 1 rider from the Intercontinental Final to 2000 Grand Prix and 6 to GP Challenge
 Final Round - 10 riders from the GP Challenge to the 2000 Grand Prix

First round

Continental quarter finals

Second round

Overseas Final
 8 riders to Intercontinental Final

Scandinavian Final
8 riders to Intercontinental Final

Continental semi finals

Third round
11 riders from positions 11-21 from the 1999 Speedway Grand Prix & World U21 champion to GP Challenge

Intercontinental Final
 1 rider direct to Grand Prix, 6 riders to GP Challenge

Continental Final 
1 rider direct to Grand Prix, 5 riders to GP Challenge
25 July 1999  Wrocław

Final Round

GP Challenge
10 riders to 2000 Grand Prix
17 October 1999  Lonigo

References 

Speedway Grand Prix Qualification
Speedway Grand Prix Qualifications
Qualification